Gaby Hauptmann (born 14 May 1957) is a German journalist and writer.

Life
Hauptmann was born in Villingen-Schwenningen in 1957. Her grandfather was the noted Black Forest based painter . She started her writing career at the Südkurier newspaper. She left after two years and formed her own business running a press office. She then became chief editor at the radio station  from 1987.

She began working for the broadcaster Südwestfunk initially as a writer but in time a director and producer.

Her first book was for children, but her first bestseller was "Suche impotenten Mann fürs Leben" which was made into the film . Her books have sold six million copies in total.
 
She has written novels in German, and filmscripts and has worked as a TV producer. Her books include "A Handful of Manhood" which has been translated into English.

In 2005 she started to write a series of books for younger readers with horse related themes.

References

1957 births
Living people
People from Tuttlingen (district)
German women journalists
20th-century German journalists
20th-century German women writers
21st-century German journalists
21st-century German women writers
German children's writers
German women children's writers
Radio Bremen people